Jutana Jhelum (Urdu جوتانہ جہلم) is a village and union council of Jhelum District in the Punjab Province of Pakistan.

It is part of Pind Dadan Khan Tehsil.

References 

Villages in Pind Dadan Khan Tehsil
Villages in Jhelum District
Jhelum District
Populated places in Tehsil Pind Dadan Khan